Mustapha Seridi (born 18 April 1941) is an Algerian former footballer who played as a midfielder. Seridi played in 16 matches for the Algeria national team between 1964 and 1970, representing Algeria at the 1968 African Cup of Nations.

References

External links
 

1941 births
Living people
Algerian footballers
Algeria international footballers
1968 African Cup of Nations players
Competitors at the 1967 Mediterranean Games
Mediterranean Games competitors for Algeria
Place of birth missing (living people)
Association football midfielders
21st-century Algerian people